Crazy Crab may refer to:

Crazy Crab, a mascot of the San Francisco Giants for the 1984 season
Hermit Crab
the pen name of the creator of the Chinese webcomic, Hexie Farm